During the reign of Gonka I (1020 CE - 1050 CE), the Chalukyas conquered Kolhapur, under their king Jayasinha (before 1024 CE). The Shilaharas had to submit to the Chalukyas in order to retain their kingdom. In the records, Gonka is described as conqueror of Kahada (Karad), Mairiage (Miraj) and Konkan. It is probable that Gonka might have extended his rule over these territories as an agent for or with the consent of his overlords.

See also
 Shilahara

References
 Bhandarkar R.G. (1957): Early History of Deccan, Sushil Gupta (I) Pvt Ltd, Calcutta.
 Fleet J.F (1896) :The Dynasties of the Kanarese District of The Bombay Presidency, Written for the Bombay Gazetteer .
 Department of Gazetteer, Govt of Maharashtra (2002) : Itihaas : Prachin Kal, Khand -1 (Marathi)
 Department of Gazetteer, Govt of Maharashtra (1960) : Kolhapur District Gazetteer
 Department of Gazetteer, Govt of Maharashtra (1964) : Kolaba District Gazetteer
 Department of Gazetteer, Govt of Maharashtra (1982) : Thane District Gazetteer
 A.S.Altekar (1936) : The Silaharas of Western India

External links
 Silver Coin of Shilaharas of Southern Maharashtra (Coinex 2006 - Souvenir)

Shilahara dynasty
11th-century monarchs in Asia
1050 deaths
Year of birth unknown